Trichocentrum lacerum is a species of orchid found from Central America to Colombia.

References

External links 

lacerum
Orchids of Central America
Orchids of Belize
Orchids of Colombia